Falakata Assembly constituency is an assembly constituency in Alipurduar district in the Indian state of West Bengal. It is reserved for scheduled castes.

Overview
As per orders of the Delimitation Commission, No. 13 Falakata Assembly constituency covers Falakata municipality, Falakata community development block and Purba Kanthalbari gram panchayat of Alipurduar I community development block.

Falakata Assembly constituency is part of No. 2 Alipurduars (Lok Sabha constituency) (ST).

Members of Legislative Assembly

Election results

2021

In the 2021 West Bengal Legislative Assembly election, Dipak Barman of BJP defeated his nearest rival Subhash Chandra Roy of TMC.

2016

In the 2016 West Bengal Legislative Assembly election, Anil Adhikari of TMC defeated his nearest rival Kshitish Chandra Ray of CPI(M).

2011

In the 2011 West Bengal Legislative Assembly election, Anil Adhikari of TMC defeated his nearest rival Rabindra Nath Barman of CPI(M).

1977-2006
In the 2006, 2001, 1996 and 1991 state assembly elections, Jogesh Chandra Barman of CPI(M) won the Falakata assembly seat defeating his nearest rivals Anil Adhikari of Trinamool Congress in 2006 and 2001, and Gajendra Nath Barman of Congress in 1996 and 1991. Contests in most years were multi cornered but only winners and runners are being mentioned. Jogendra Nath Singha Roy of CPI(M) defeated Lalit Mohan Roy of Congress in 1987, Jogesh Chandra Ray of Congress in 1982 and Gajendra Nath Barman of Congress in 1977.

1957–1972
Jagadananda Roy of Congress won the seat in 1972, 1971 and 1969. Jagadananda Roy representing PSP won the seat in 1967. Hiralal Singha of Congress won in 1962. Jagadananda Roy of PSP won in 1957.

References

Assembly constituencies of West Bengal
Politics of Alipurduar district